Four ships of the Royal Navy have borne the name HMS Niobe, after the figure of Niobe in Greek mythology:

 was a 28-gun sixth rate launched in 1849 and sold to the Prussian Navy in 1862.
 was a wood screw sloop launched in 1866 and wrecked in 1874.
 was a  protected cruiser launched in 1897. She was transferred to the Royal Canadian Navy in 1910, used as a depot ship from 1915 and was broken up in 1922.

Royal Navy ship names